XHXAN-FM is a community radio station on 102.9 FM in Tacámbaro, Michoacán. It is known as Xanarapani Radio.

History
XHXAN received its concession on November 27, 2017, moving to 102.9 after previously being an unlicensed station on 90.7. Xanarapani Tacámbaro is controlled by Juan Ignacio Cancino García, a businessman who provides lighting and sound systems for events.

References

Radio stations in Michoacán
Radio stations established in 2018
Community radio stations in Mexico
2018 establishments in Mexico